Ashton, Gardner and Dyke were a British rock trio, most popular in the early 1970s. They are best remembered for their song, "Resurrection Shuffle", a transatlantic Top 40 one-hit wonder in 1971.

History
Founding band member Tony Ashton first met the drummer Roy Dyke when playing with various Blackpool-based groups.

Ashton was invited to join the Liverpool beat group The Remo Four as organist/vocalist, whilst Roy Dyke became the group's drummer, having joined them in 1963. Their best work came in 1966 when they released their album Smile!. Before their breakup in 1968, they backed George Harrison on his album Wonderwall Music. Harrison later played guitar on their song "I'm Your Spiritual Breadman".

Ashton and Dyke then joined forces in 1968 with the bass-guitar-playing Kim Gardner, who had previously played in minor British groups The Birds and The Creation. The three simply called themselves Ashton, Gardner and Dyke. Mick Liber, formerly of Python Lee Jackson, played lead guitar with the group.
 
They released their first single "Maiden Voyage"/"See The Sun In My Eyes" on Polydor Records in 1969, but it flopped. However, their next single, "Resurrection Shuffle" on Capitol Records, made them household names. The brass section was Lyle Jenkins and Dave Caswell of the Birmingham band Galliard. The song entered the UK Singles Chart on 16 January 1971, had a chart life of 14 weeks, and peaked at Number 3. The song reached number 40 in the U.S. Billboard Hot 100 chart. The song was their only hit record, earning them the designation of one-hit wonders. The song has since been covered by a number of artists, including Tom Jones and Clarence Clemons.

Their follow-up single "Can You Get It" lacked the general boisterous appeal of "Resurrection Shuffle", and failed to chart. Nevertheless, Ashton Gardner and Dyke persevered and recorded three albums (see discography below). The trio also backed Irish singer Jonathan Kelly on his 1970 debut album. And the following year, they appeared together with other British jazz and rock musicians on Leigh Stephens' Cast of Thousands (1971).

Also in the band for a period of time and on the cover of their "Best Of" cd was ex-Bee Gees guitarist Vince Melouney.

Their last recording together was a collaboration with Jon Lord on the soundtrack for a B movie, The Last Rebel, starring former gridiron star, Joe Namath. Ashton also appeared on Lord's first solo album Gemini Suite in 1972. The trio finally split the same year.

Afterwards
After the band's demise, Tony Ashton went on to play for Medicine Head, and was briefly in Family before teaming up again with Deep Purple's Jon Lord in Ashton & Lord. Later still he appeared with Lord and Purple's drummer Ian Paice as Paice Ashton Lord. Dyke and then Gardner joined Badger.

Ashton died of cancer on 28 May 2001. Gardner also died of cancer on 24 October 2001, in Los Angeles, California, aged 53.

Discography

Studio albums

Soundtracks

Live albums

Singles

Band members
Tony Ashton — (born Edward Anthony Ashton, 1 March 1946, Blackburn; died 28 May 2001) — keyboardist and vocalist
Kim Gardner — (born 27 January 1948, Dulwich, London; died 24 October 2001) — bassist
Roy Dyke — (born 13 February 1945, Liverpool) — drummer
Mick Liber — (born 1 March 1944, Peebles, Scotland) — lead guitarist.

See also
List of one-hit wonders on the UK Singles Chart

References

External links
 

Capitol Records artists
English rock music groups
Musical groups established in 1969
Musical groups disestablished in 1972
Polydor Records artists